Taizi was the title of the crown prince of imperial China.

Succession 

Traditional Confucian political theory favored strict agnatic primogeniture, with younger sons displaying filial obedience to the eldest upon the passing of the father. This rather straightforward system was somewhat complicated by polygamy: since later wives were subordinated to the first, their children  even when born first  were likewise subordinated to hers.

Following Lu Jia's conversion of Liu Bang to Confucianism in the early 1st century BC, Chinese dynasties observed it in theory though not always in practice. Liu Bang himself began to favor Concubine Qi, a later concubine, to his primary empress, Lü Zhi, 
and doubted the competence of his heir Liu Ying. Even worse conflicts could occur when invaders  previously observing their own rules of inheritance  began to sinicize, as happened to the 10th-century Liao dynasty.

Under the Ming dynasty, the traditional Confucian principles of succession were upheld by the Hongwu Emperor's Instructions of the Ancestor of the August Ming. These presented a grave problem when his eldest son died early, leaving a power struggle between a sheltered teenage grandson and his many experienced and well-armed uncles. One of these, the Prince of Yan, eventually overthrew his nephew under the pretense of saving him from ill counsel. His own legitimacy was precariously established: a charred body was procured from the ruins of Nanjing and proclaimed to be the accidentally-killed emperor; the nephew's reign was then condemned and delegitimized and the surviving son kept imprisoned and single; and imperial records were falsified to establish the Prince of Yan as his father's favorite and as a son of the primary wife, giving him primacy over his other brothers.

Names
As taizi, the crown prince would possess a name separate both from his personal name and from his later era name, temple name and posthumous name.

Lists

Crown Princes of Zhou
Jī Xiefu, son of King Ping of Zhou

Crown Princes of Han
Crown Prince Ying, son of Liu Bang (Emperor Gao), later Emperor Hui
Crown Prince Qi, son of Emperor Wen, later Emperor Jing
Crown Prince Rong, son of Emperor Jing, later demoted to Prince of Linjiang
Crown Prince Che, son of Emperor Jing, originally Prince of Jiaodong and later Emperor Wu
Crown Prince Li, son of Emperor Wu, rebelled and killed
Crown Prince Fuling, son of Emperor Wu, later Emperor Zhao
Crown Prince Shu, son of Emperor Xuan, later Emperor Yuan
Crown Prince Ao, son of Emperor Yuan, later Emperor Cheng
Crown Prince Xin, grandson of Emperor Yuan, originally Prince of Dingtao, later adopted by Emperor Cheng, whom he succeeded as Emperor Ai

Crown Princes of Tang
Li Jiancheng, son of Tang Gaozu, killed during the Xuanwu Gate Incident
Li Chengqian, son of Tang Taizong, demoted
Li Zhi, son of Tang Taizong, later Emperor Gaozong
Li Zhong, son of Tang Gaozong, forced to commit suicide
Li Hong, son of Tang Gaozong, either died of illness or poisoned by mother Wu Zetian
Li Longji, son of Tang Ruizong, later Emperor Xuanzong

Crown Princes of Ming
Crown Prince Yiwen, son of the Hongwu Emperor, predeceased his father
Crown Prince Zhu Yunwen, son of Crown Prince Yiwen, later the Jianwen Emperor, posthumously demoted & restored
Crown Prince Hejian, son of the Jianwen Emperor, allegedly burnt to death, posthumously demoted & restored
Crown Prince Zhu Gaochi, son of the Yongle Emperor, later the Hongxi Emperor
Crown Prince Zhu Zhanji, son of the Hongxi Emperor, later the Xuande Emperor
Crown Prince Zhu Qizhen, son of the Xuande Emperor, later the Zhengtong & Tianshun Emperor
Crown Prince Zhu Jianshen, son of the Zhengtong & Tianshun Emperor, demoted
Crown Prince Huaixian, son of the Jingtai Emperor, demoted & posthumously restored
Crown Prince Zhu Jianshen, restored, later the Chenghua Emperor
Crown Prince Daogong, son of the Chenghua Emperor, predeceased his father
Crown Prince Zhu Youcheng, son of the Chenghua Emperor, later the Hongzhi Emperor
Crown Prince Zhu Houzhao, son of the Hongzhi Emperor, later the Zhengde Emperor
Crown Prince Aichong, son of the Jiajing Emperor, predeceased his father
Crown Prince Zhuangjin, son of the Jiajing Emperor, predeceased his father
Crown Prince Zhu Zaihou, son of the Jiajing Emperor, later the Longqing Emperor
Crown Prince Zhu Yijun, son of the Longqing Emperor, later the Wanli Emperor
Crown Prince Zhu Changluo, son of the Wanli Emperor, later the Taichang Emperor
Crown Prince Zhu Youxiao, son of the Taichang Emperor, later the Tianqi Emperor
Crown Prince Huaichong, son of the Tianqi Emperor, predeceased his father
Crown Prince Daohuai, son of the Tianqi Emperor, predeceased his father
Crown Prince Xianchong, son of the Tianqi Emperor, predeceased his father
Crown Prince Xianmin, son of the Chongzhen Emperor

See also 
 Crown prince
 The "Crown Prince Party" faction of the Chinese Communist Party, which employs the same characters

Notes

References 

Chinese princes
Crown princes

zh:太子#中国